Ubon United Football Club (Thai สโมสรฟุตบอลอุบล ยูไนเต็ด), is a Thai professional football club based in Ubon Ratchathani, Thailand. The club plays in the Thai League 2. The club was formed in 2015 and entered the Regional League Division 2 to allocated into the North-East Division from Derby match province project.

History

In 2015 Assistant Professor Dr Wirasak Jinarat, chancellor of The Eastern University of Management and Technology (UMT), filed a request with the Football Association of Thailand for founding a football club by separating from Ubon UMT F.C. and began 2015 in the Regional League Division 2 Northeast Zone. In 2016 the club won the Thai Division 1 League and were promoted to the Thai League 1 for the first time.

A new ground, UMT Stadium, was built stadium in The Eastern University of Management and Technology (UMT), from which the club has taken its name. The stadium was inaugurated for the 2017 season.

At the end of 2018, The club changed the name and logo to Ubon United.

The club was dissolved at the end of season 2019 after the club not passed the club licensing due to wage problems.

Stadium and locations

Season By Season record

P = Played
W = Games won
D = Games drawn
L = Games lost
F = Goals for
A = Goals against
Pts = Points
Pos = Final position
N/A = No answer

TPL = Thai Premier League
TL = Thai League 1

QR1 = First Qualifying Round
QR2 = Second Qualifying Round
QR3 = Third Qualifying Round
QR4 = Fourth Qualifying Round
RInt = Intermediate Round
R1 = Round 1
R2 = Round 2
R3 = Round 3

R4 = Round 4
R5 = Round 5
R6 = Round 6
GR = Group stage
QF = Quarter-finals
SF = Semi-finals
RU = Runners-up
S = Shared
W = Winners

Coaches
Coaches by years (2014–present)

 Nopporn Eksatra 
 Jakarat Tonhongsa 
 Scott Cooper 
 Mixu Paatelainen  
 Sugao Kambe   
 Eduardo Almeida   
 Thanaset Amornsinkittichote   
 Suriyan Jamchen  
 Sirisak Yodyardthai

Honours
Thai Division 1 League:
  Runners-up (1): 2016
Regional League Division 2:
  Winners (1): 2015
Regional League North-East Division
  Runners-up (1): 2015

References

External links
 Ubon United

 
Association football clubs established in 2010
Thai League 1 clubs
Football clubs in Thailand
Ubon Ratchathani province
2010 establishments in Thailand